is a Japanese politician of the Liberal Democratic Party, a member of the House of Representatives in the Diet (national legislature). A native of Kasuya District, Fukuoka and graduate of Kyushu University, he worked at the Ministry of Transport from 1964 to 1994. After teaching at Fukuoka University, he was elected to the House of Representatives for the first time in 1996.

References

External links 
 Official website in Japanese.

1941 births
Living people
People from Kasuga, Fukuoka
Members of the House of Representatives (Japan)
Liberal Democratic Party (Japan) politicians
Kyushu University alumni
21st-century Japanese politicians
Politicians from Fukuoka Prefecture